The Cell 2  is a 2009 direct-to-video sequel to the 2000 film The Cell. Directed by Tim Iacofano
and written by Lawerence Silverstein, Alex Barder and Rob Rinow, the movie is similar in themes as the original, about an investigator who must enter the mind of a serial killer.

Plot
A serial killer calling himself "The Cusp" murders his victims and then revives them, until they beg to die. His first victim, psychic investigator Maya Casteneda (Tessie Santiago), survives and is bent on revenge. After she is tapped by the FBI, Maya realizes the only way to locate The Cusp is by entering his mind. But if she dies there, she will also die in real life. Also stars Chris Bruno as Sheriff Harris.

Cast
 Tessie Santiago as Maya Casteneda
 Chris Bruno as Sheriff Harris
 Michael Flynn as Kessel
 Bart Johnson as FBI Skylar
 Frank Whaley as Duncan
 Amee Walden as Penelope
 Charles Halford as Deputy Finch
 Paul Kiernan as Coroner

Release
The Cell 2 was released on DVD in the United States on June 16, 2009. It was named one of the worst movies of 2009 by Bloody Disgusting.

References

External links
 
 

2009 films
2009 psychological thriller films
2000s science fiction horror films
American science fiction horror films
BDSM in films
Direct-to-video horror films
New Line Cinema direct-to-video films
Direct-to-video sequel films
American serial killer films
Film controversies in Samoa
2000s English-language films
2000s American films